Villingili is the only resort island of Addu Atoll, Maldives.

In 1997 the government of the Maldives contracted the American firm Abonmarche to build a large resort and marina there, to attract tourism. Later, the government redacted this contract in 2000 and, finding no other bidders, awarded it to another firm called "Energy Tours" to build a smaller resort. Energy Tours defaulted on this contract.

In 2005 Maldives President Maumoon Abdul Gayoom contracted Shangri-La Hotels and Resorts, a Hong Kong-based company, to build the first luxury resort in Addu Atoll. The resort is being developed by Addu Investment Private Limited (70%) and the Maldivian Government (30%). The resort cost an estimated USD 150 million and opened in early 2009. Shangri-La's Villingili Resort & Spa features a range of 132 villas including two Presidential Villas.The Villingili Shangri-La Resort is currently closed indefinitely 

The island is also notable for having the highest natural elevation in the Maldives, Mount Villingili. It stands at a modest  and is located at tee number eight on Villingili's Golf Course – the only golf course in the Maldives.

References

External links
 The Villingili Fiasco
  Gayoom Awards Villingili Resort to Brother-in-Law Without a Bid Process; Resort Owners Angry
 Shangri-La's Villingili Resort & Spa

Islands of the Maldives
Highest points of countries